Ján Bernát (born 10 January 2001) is a Slovak professional footballer who plays for as a midfielder for Belgian First Division A club Westerlo.

Club career 
Bernát made his Fortuna Liga debut for Žilina against ViOn Zlaté Moravce during a home fixture on 2 March 2019. He came on about half hour before the end as a replacement for Patrik Myslovič, with the score at 1:1. Žilina eventually took the win after a goal by Filip Balaj.

International career
Bernát was first recognised in a senior national team nomination on 23 May 2022, while still being active in the U21 team although he remained unnominated for June international fixtures following a suspension ahead of a qualifier against Malta. Štefan Tarkovič recognised him as an alternate ahead of four UEFA Nations League fixtures against Belarus, Azerbaijan and Kazakhstan.

Personal life
Based on his social media communication, Bernát is a Christian.

Honours 
Westerlo
 Belgian First Division B: 2021–22

References

External links
 MŠK Žilina official club profile 
  
 Futbalnet profile 
 

2001 births
Sportspeople from Prešov
Living people
Slovak footballers
Slovakia youth international footballers
Slovakia under-21 international footballers
Association football midfielders
MŠK Žilina players
K.V.C. Westerlo players
Slovak Super Liga players
Challenger Pro League players
Expatriate footballers in Belgium
Slovak expatriate sportspeople in Belgium
Slovak Christians